Ulam may refer to:

 ULAM, the ICAO airport code for Naryan-Mar Airport, Russia
 Ulam (surname)
 Ulam (salad), a type of Malay salad
 Ulam, a Filipino term loosely translated to viand or side dish; see Tapa (Filipino cuisine)
 Ulam, the language spoken by prehistoric humans in the movie Quest for Fire
 Ulam, the name of the porch of Solomon's Temple held up by the pillars

See also
List of things named after Stanislaw Ulam